The International Beacon Project (IBP) is a worldwide network of radio propagation beacons. It consists of 18 continuous wave (CW) beacons operating on five designated frequencies in the high frequency band. The IBP beacons provide a means of assessing the prevailing ionospheric signal propagation characteristics to both amateur and commercial high frequency radio users.

The project is coordinated by the Northern California DX Foundation (NCDXF) and the International Amateur Radio Union (IARU). The first beacon of the IBP started operations from Northern California in 1979. The network was expanded to include 8 and subsequently 18 international transmission sites.

History 
The first beacon was put into operation in 1979 using the call sign WB6ZNL. It transmitted a 1 minute long beacon every 10 minutes on 14.1 MHz using custom built transmitter and controller hardware. The beacon consisted of the call sign transmitted at 100 watts, four 9 second long dashes each at 100 watts, 10 watts, 1 watt and 0.1 watt, followed by sign out at 100 watts.

NCDXF and seven partnering organizations from United States, Finland, Portugal, Israel, Japan, Honolulu and Argentina operated the first iteration of the beacon network. Due to difficulties encountered in building beacon hardware, each site used a Kenwood TS-120 transceiver keyed and controlled by a custom built beacon controller unit. The network operated on 14.1 MHz and the beacon format remained unchanged.

In 1995, work began to improve the existing beacon network, so it could operate on five designated frequencies on the high frequency band. The new beacon network used Kenwood TS-50 transceivers keyed and controlled by an upgraded beacon controller unit. The number of partner organizations were expanded to 18 and the new 10 second beacon format was adopted.

Notable Projects 
Beyond helping amateur radio operators better understand HF radio propagation the project has aided scientists in better understanding the earths ionosphere, improved prediction models, and aided in radio direction finding.

Frequencies and transmission schedule 
The beacons are transmitted on the frequencies 14.100 MHz, 18.110 MHz, 21.150 MHz, 24.930 MHz and 28.200 MHz. Each beacon transmission site operates around the clock. Beacon is transmitted once on each frequency, from low (14.100 MHz) to high (28.200 MHz), followed by a 130-second pause after which the cycle is repeated. Each transmission is 10 second long, and consists of the call sign of the beacon transmitted at 22 words per minute (WPM) followed by four dashes. The call sign and the first dash is transmitted at 100 watts of power. Subsequent three dashes are transmitted at 10 watts, 1 watt and 0.1 watt respectively.

All beacon transmissions are coordinated using GPS time. As such, at a given frequency, all 18 beacons are transmitted once every three minutes.

Hardware 
As of today, beacons are transmitted using commercial HF transceivers (Kenwood TS-50 or Icom IC-7200) keyed and coordinated by a purpose built Beacon Controller unit.

Beacons 
IBP operates the following beacons as of March 2017.

Notes and references 

Radio frequency propagation
Beacons